Eupithecia supporta is a moth in the family Geometridae. It is found in Mexico.

References

External links

Moths described in 1918
supporta
Moths of Central America